Kripa Shankar Patel Bishnoi (born 5 August 1977) is an Indian professional wrestler and coach.

Biography
Kripa Shankar Patel Bishnoi was born on 5 August 1977, in Khandwa (district of Harsud tehsil in Madhya Pradesh). He completed a diploma course in sports coaching at the Netaji Subhas National Institute of Sports (India). He passed the United World Wrestling International Referee Course with distinction in 2016. Subsequently, Bishnoi was named to United World Wrestling's international panel of referees.

Wrestling career
He has participated in 53 international wrestling competitions, winning 11 gold, 8 silver, and 5 bronze medals.
 
Mr. Patel represented India in Asian cadet wrestling competition held from 3 to 5 December 1989 and by beating the Iranian wrestler K.D. Mohammad with a great score of 8/1 established his first step in international wrestling scenario and then always remained glittering in the whole world representing India.

Commonwealth Games
Competing in the Flyweight division, Bishnoi was a bronze medalist at the 15th edition of the Commonwealth Games.

Commonwealth Wrestling Championship Events
Bishnoi competed in Commonwealth Wrestling Championship tournaments, achieving medals in multiple disciplines. He is the only wrestler who made a world record of winning 2 golds in 1 competition but in different categories (freestyle wrestling and Greco-Roman wrestling).
2003 (London, Canada)
Silver medal – 
2005 (Cape Town, South Africa)
Gold medal – under 55 weight category, Freestyle wrestling
Gold medal – under 55 weight category, Greco-Roman wrestling
2007 (London, Canada)
Gold medal – Freestyle wrestling
Silver medal – Greco-Roman wrestling

Olympic Qualifying Events

Bishnoi represented India four times in Olympic qualifying tournaments: , 2000, Leipzig, Germany, 5th place; 2000, Tokyo, Japan, 10th place; 2000, Minsk, Belarus; 2008, warsaw, Poland. He also competed at World Cup events in Canada, winning gold in 2003 and 2007.In Canada world cup Mr. Patel competed with all wrestlers and proved to be a perfectionist in his sports by winning a gold in Canada world cup (11 to 12 July 2003, Canada).

Asian Competitions
Bishnoi competed in the 1998 Asian Games (Bangkok, Thailand) and 2002 Asian Games (Bussan, South Korea), and in the Asian Wrestling Championships, placing 4th in 2000 (Gulin, China), 4th in 2001 (Ulaanbaatar, Mongolia), and earning a bronze medal in 2003 Asian Wrestling Championships (New Delhi, India). Bishnoi won gold medals at the 7th, 8th, and 9th editions of the South Asian Games.

Awards
In 2000, Bishnoi received the Arjuna Award in recognition of outstanding National (India) achievement in sport. In 1994 he was a recipient of the Vikram Award.

Coaching
After retiring from wrestling competition, Bishnoi served as coach for Indian female wrestlers at the senior national coaching camp, contributing to a 2016 bronze medal in women's wrestling in 2016 Summer Olympics for India. Bishnoi is also a referee.

Bollywood career

Bishnoi was recruited to train Aamir Khan, Fatima Sana Shaikh, Sanya Malhotra, and supporting actors for the Bollywood movie Dangal. The film is based on the life of renowned Indian wrestler Mahavir Singh Phogat, who coached his daughters, Geeta Phogat and Babita Kumari to gold medals at the 2010 Commonwealth Games. Working with the actors for over six months prior to filming, Bishnoi focused on wrestling moves and general conditioning. The film was 2017's highest-grossing sports film worldwide. Following the film's release, Bishnoi defended Khan against allegations that the actor has used steroids during his physical training regime.

Controversy
In 2017, the Wrestling Federation of India imposed a six-year ban on Bishnoi, following Bishnoi's criticism of the organization. Bishnoi has become an advocate and vocal proponent of changes he has proposed for regulations governed by the (Indian) National and International wrestling federations.

References

1977 births
Living people
Indian male sport wrestlers
Wrestlers at the 1998 Asian Games
Wrestlers at the 2002 Asian Games
South Asian Games gold medalists for India
South Asian Games silver medalists for India
Asian Games competitors for India
South Asian Games medalists in wrestling
Recipients of the Arjuna Award
Wrestlers at the 1994 Commonwealth Games
Commonwealth Games medallists in wrestling
Commonwealth Games bronze medallists for India
Asian Wrestling Championships medalists
20th-century Indian people
21st-century Indian people
Medallists at the 1994 Commonwealth Games